Illzach is a commune in the Haut-Rhin department in Alsace in north-eastern France.

It is located in the north side of the Mulhouse metropolitan area, and forms part of the Mulhouse Alsace Agglomération, the inter-communal local government body for that area.

Population

See also
 Communes of the Haut-Rhin département

References

External links

Official website 

Communes of Haut-Rhin